Ceroid-lipofuscinosis neuronal protein 6 is a protein that in humans is encoded by the CLN6 gene.

The CLN6 protein is part of the EGRESS complex (ER-to-Golgi relaying of enzymes of the lysosomal system), which recruits lysosomal enzymes at the endoplasmic reticulum to promote their transfer to the Golgi complex. The EGRESS complex is composed of CLN6 and CLN8 proteins. Loss-of-function mutations in CLN6 result in inefficient export of lysosomal enzymes from the endoplasmic reticulum and diminished levels of the enzymes at the lysosome.

See also 
 Batten disease

References

External links
  GeneReviews/NIH/NCBI/UW entry on Neuronal Ceroid-Lipofuscinoses

Further reading